Senator Russo may refer to:

Anthony E. Russo (born 1926), New Jersey State Senate
John F. Russo (1933–2017), New Jersey State Senate